Anglimp Rural LLG is a local-level government (LLG) of Jiwaka Province, Papua New Guinea.

Wards
01. Kaip 1
02. Kaip 2
03. Kaip 3
04. Polga 1
05. Polga 2
06. Wurup 1
07. Wurup 2
08. Wurup 3
09. Wurup 4
10. Kiliga 1
11. Kiliga 2
12. Ulya
13. Kuki Kipan
14. Panga
15. Kutubugl 1
16. Komon
17. Kutubugl 2
18. Ketepung 1
19. Ketepung 2
20. Rogomp 1
21. Rogomp 2
22. Ketepam 1
23. Ketepam 2
24. Ketepam 3
25. Rukraka
26. Papen
27. Kindeng 1
28. Kindeng 2
29. Mugamamp
30. Mandan
31. Avi 1
32. Avi 2
33. Dopdop 1
34. Dopdop 2
35. Dopdop 3
36. Dopdop 4

References

Local-level governments of Jiwaka Province